Oelrichs (Lakota: šuŋkpȟáwaksa; "Severed Horse Head") is a town in Fall River County, South Dakota, United States. The population was 117 at the 2020 census.

History

Oelrichs was laid out in 1885. The town was founded by Henry (Harry) Oelrichs, superintendent of the Anglo-American Cattle Company. A post office called Oelrichs has been in operation since 1885.

Geography

Oelrichs is located at  (43.181458, -103.233601).

Oelrichs has been assigned the ZIP code 57763 and the FIPS place code 46500.

Climate

Demographics

2010 census
As of the census of 2010, there were 126 people, 61 households, and 38 families residing in the town. The racial makeup of the town was 79.4% White, 18.3% Native American, and 2.4% from two or more races.

There were 61 households, of which 19.7% had children under the age of 18 living with them, 41.0% were married couples living together, 19.7% had a female householder with no husband present, 1.6% had a male householder with no wife present, and 37.7% were non-families. 34.4% of all households were made up of individuals, and 19.7% had someone living alone who was 65 years of age or older. The average household size was 2.07 and the average family size was 2.61.

The median age in the town was 53 years. 18.3% of residents were under the age of 18; 2.4% were between the ages of 18 and 24; 22.2% were from 25 to 44; 34.1% were from 45 to 64; and 23% were 65 years of age or older. The gender makeup of the town was 47.6% male and 52.4% female.

2000 census
As of the census of 2000, there were 145 people, 67 households, and 45 families residing in the town. The population density was 384.0 people per square mile (147.3/km2). There were 76 housing units at an average density of 201.3 per square mile (77.2/km2). The racial makeup of the town was 83.45% White, 15.86% Native American, and 0.69% from two or more races.

There were 67 households, out of which 16.4% had children under the age of 18 living with them, 50.7% were married couples living together, 11.9% had a female householder with no husband present, and 32.8% were non-families. 25.4% of all households were made up of individuals, and 17.9% had someone living alone who was 65 years of age or older. The average household size was 2.16 and the average family size was 2.47.

In the town, the population was spread out, with 16.6% under the age of 18, 4.1% from 18 to 24, 15.9% from 25 to 44, 29.7% from 45 to 64, and 33.8% who were 65 years of age or older. The median age was 51 years. For every 100 females, there were 90.8 males. For every 100 females age 18 and over, there were 92.1 males.

The median income for a household in the town was $27,222, and the median income for a family was $28,906. Males had a median income of $19,583 versus $19,167 for females. The per capita income for the town was $13,454. There were 5.1% of families and 12.7% of the population living below the poverty line, including 36.0% of under eighteens and 2.0% of those over 64.

References

Towns in Fall River County, South Dakota
Towns in South Dakota